Colombia is a municipality and town in the Las Tunas Province of Cuba. Río Tana flows through the community.

Demographics
In 2004, the municipality of Colombia had a population of 32,942.

See also
Municipalities of Cuba
List of cities in Cuba

References

External links

Populated places in Las Tunas Province